Fort Royal Hill is a park in Worcester, England, and the site of the remains of an English Civil War fort.

History
Fort Royal was a Civil War sconce (or redoubt) on a small hill to the south-east of Worcester overlooking the Sidbury Gate. It was built by the Royalists in 1651 to defend the hill, because during the siege in 1646 Parliamentary forces had positioned their artillery on the hill and had been able to severely damage the city's walls.

During the final stages of the Battle of Worcester, fought on 3 September 1651, the last battle of the war and a Parliamentary victory, the Royalists retreat turned into a rout in which Parliamentarian and Royalist forces intermingled and skirmished up to and into the city.  The Royalist position became untenable when the Essex militia stormed and captured Fort Royal,  turning the Royalist guns to fire on Worcester.

In early April 1786, John Adams and Thomas Jefferson visited Fort Royal Hill at the battlefield at Worcester. Adams wrote

On 23 October 2009 a Virginian oak tree was planted in Fort Royal Park by Rear Admiral Ronald H. Henderson, Defence Attaché to the Embassy of the United States, to commemorate this occasion.

Notes

References

External links

Geography of Worcester, England
History of Worcester, England
Tourist attractions in Worcester, England
Parks and open spaces in Worcestershire
Hills of Worcestershire
Forts in Worcestershire